Harbour Park, still known by some locals by its former name Smarts, is an amusement park in the coastal resort of Littlehampton, West Sussex, England. Opened in 1932, it is situated on the beach, adjacent to the working Harbour & Marina. The Park Features traditional rides plus other modern attractions.

History 

The park was started in 1932 by Billy Butlin on the site of the old east bank fort and windmill It was easily spotted from a distance by the presence of a large roller coaster on the roof known as "The Wild Mouse". Early pictures of this can be viewed in the West Sussex past pictures archive reference numbers PP/WSL/PC005524 & PP/WSL/TC001729. A picture of the old site prior to construction is also available reference number PP/WSL/PC005512.

During the war the park closed from 1941 to 1945, and the building was used for storage and the gathering of troops going overseas. The building suffered bomb damage during that time; but was repaired and reopened after the war as part of the Butlin's Empire, which was later purchased by the Rank Organisation.

In 1977, the park was bought from the Rank Organisation by the Billy Smart Circus family and was renamed Smart's Amusement Park. They set about re-equipping it into a family amusement centre with a selection of indoor rides, including a hall of mirrors

In 1994, the current owner, Gary Smart oversaw a sizeable redevelopment of the site. The name changed from Smart’s Amusement Park to the contemporary Harbour Park, which reflected the theme running throughout the site and its unique location on the seafront and riverside. Over the next few years, major works were undertaken and the final phase was completed in the year 2000. The roller coasters were removed during this time.

Harbour Park entered the new millennium with a new look, whilst managing to retain the Smart family values of providing a friendly, fun and entertaining family venue. In fact, Billy Smart still watches over the park in the form of a magnificent bronze statue located in the main building.

2007 saw another major investment of £750,000 including the addition of a log flume. Supplier DPV Rides of Italy developed a water ride that would feature a 6.5 metre drop, inside a 34×14 metre footprint.

In 2009, the indoor artificial skating rink was replaced by the soft play area.

Attractions

There have been a large variety of indoor and outdoor rides and attractions. Some of the rides are described at the Roller Coaster DataBase (RCDB).

Refreshment Areas
A maritime themed Galley Restaurant & Tea Rooms (serving tea the old-fashioned way with real leaves)
The Harbour Coffee House, which offers a selection of hot and cold food, and frothy hot chocolate with marshmallows
The Riverside Parlours serving hot fresh doughnuts, ice creams, and other light refreshments.

Gallery

References

External links 
 

Amusement parks in England
Littlehampton
Tourist attractions in West Sussex
Arun District
Butlins
1932 establishments in England